"The Nightingale" (Danish: "Nattergalen") is a literary fairy tale written by Danish author Hans Christian Andersen. Set in ancient China, the story recounts the friendship between the Emperor and a nightingale.

Gallery

Notes

References 

 
 
 
 

 
 
 
 
 
 Burton, Marianne (2013) She Inserts the Key. Seren is the book imprint of Poetry Wales Press Ltd, Bridgend. www.serenbooks.com

External links

 "Nattergalen": Original Danish text
 "The Nightingale": English translation by Jean Hersholt
 "Did the emperor suffer from tuberculosis?", essay of 17 March 2005 researched and written by Cecilia Jorgensen for World Tuberculosis Day.
 

1843 short stories
Short stories by Hans Christian Andersen
Fictional birds
Works set in Imperial China
Works about nightingales